Clyde Raymond Conner (August 4, 1884 – January 24, 1919) was a college football player, prominent lawyer of Hattiesburg, Mississippi, and once United States Commissioner.

College football
Conner was a prominent tackle for both the Ole Miss Rebels of the University of Mississippi and a prominent center for the Virginia Cavaliers of the University of Virginia.

Ole Miss

1902
In a 21 to 0 Egg Bowl victory, Conner "plunged through the line at will" according to the Memphis paper.

1906
He was selected All-Southern in 1906.

University of Virginia

1903
He was also selected All-Southern in 1903, the year he played with Virginia.

Attorney

Death
Conner died at his home on January 24, 1919, of blood poisoning. While at a barber shop he had an inverted hair removed from his neck. No trouble resulted until two days later it became quite irritated.

References

External links

All-Southern college football players
American football tackles
American football guards
American football centers
Players of American football from Mississippi
Sportspeople from Hattiesburg, Mississippi
Ole Miss Rebels football players
Virginia Cavaliers football players
1884 births
1919 deaths
People from Macon, Mississippi